Fomes fasciatus is a species of fungus in the family Polyporaceae. It is a plant pathogen that causes white rot of heartwood of hardwoods. Originally described in 1788 by Swedish botanist Olof Swartz from specimens collected in Jamaica, it is also found in North America.

See also
List of Platanus diseases
List of sweetgum diseases

References

External links 

 Fomes fasciatus occurrence data from GBIF

Fungi described in 1788
Fungi of North America
Polyporaceae
Fungal tree pathogens and diseases
Taxa named by Olof Swartz